Dading is a 2014 Philippine television drama series broadcast by GMA Network. Directed by Ricky Davao, it stars Gabby Eigenmann in the title role. It premiered on June 23, 2014 on the network's Afternoon Prime line up replacing Innamorata. The series concluded on October 10, 2014 with a total of 79 episodes. It was replaced by Yagit in its timeslot.

The series is streaming online on YouTube.

Premise
Carding is an adult gay man who decided to raise Precious – the love child of his best friend, Beth and her lover Joemer.

Cast and characters

Lead cast
 Gabby Eigenmann as Ricardo "Carding / Dading" Gonzales

Supporting cast
 Glaiza de Castro as Elizabeth "Beth" Marasigan-Gonzales
 Benjamin Alves as Joemar "JM" Rodriguez
 Chynna Ortaleza as Celine Pacheco-Rodriguez
 Gardo Versoza as Alfredo "Mother Lexi" Ignacio
 Sharmaine Buencamino as Mila Marasigan
 Toby Alejar as Bernard Marasigan
 Mymy Davao as Nenette Velasquez
 RJ Padilla as Dindo
 Zarah Mae Deligero as Precious M. Rodriguez

Guest cast
 Elle Ramirez as Glenda
 Zandra Summer as Josie
 Juan Rodrigo as Romeo Rodriguez
 Maricel Morales as Therese Santiago
 Almira Muhlach as Veronne Pacheco
 Julia Lee as Sofia
 Ken Alfonso as Carlo
 Sef Cadayona as Pato
 Sofia Pablo as Hannah
 Lexter Capili as Bebet
 Bianca Umali as teen Precious
 Antoinette Garcia
 Freddie Webb as Ricardo's father

Ratings
According to AGB Nielsen Philippines' Mega Manila household television ratings, the pilot episode of Dading earned an 11.6% rating. While the final episode scored a 20.6% rating, which is the series' highest rating.

Accolades

References

External links
 
 

2014 Philippine television series debuts
2014 Philippine television series endings
2010s LGBT-related drama television series
Filipino-language television shows
GMA Network drama series
Philippine LGBT-related television shows
Television shows set in Manila